Carclaze is a suburb of the town of St Austell in mid-Cornwall, England, United Kingdom. The suburb forms part of the civil parish of Treverbyn and gives its name to the china clay works to the north.Carclaze mine produced tin and china clay for over 400 years. The tin ore is intermixed with shorl and quartz and is quarried rather than mined, with the whole rock crushed and washed to separate the tin. The mine was worked exclusively for tin until 1851 when china clay was also quarried.

Famous residents 

 Mike Shaw, The Who.

References

External links

 The role of Carclaze tin mine in eighteenth and nineteenth century geotourism

Populated places in Cornwall
St Austell